WYPH-LP (102.5 FM, "Y102.5") was a radio station licensed to serve the community of Manchester, Connecticut. The station was owned by New River Community Church. It aired a contemporary Christian music format.

The station was assigned the WYPH-LP call letters by the Federal Communications Commission on February 14, 2014. New River Community Church surrendered WYPH-LP's license to the FCC on January 5, 2022, who cancelled it on January 6.

References

External links
 Official Website
 

YPH-LP
YPH-LP
Radio stations established in 2014
Radio stations disestablished in 2022
2014 establishments in Connecticut
2022 disestablishments in Connecticut
Hartford County, Connecticut
Defunct radio stations in the United States
Defunct religious radio stations in the United States
YPH-LP